NeTEx  (formally Network Timetable Exchange PD CEN/TS 16614-1:2014', PD CEN/TS 16614-2:2014 and PD CEN/TS 16614-3:2014) is the CEN Technical standard   for  exchanging Public Transport Information  as  XML documents. It provides a W3C XML schema based on the Transmodel abstract model of common  public transport concepts and data structures and can be used to exchange many different kinds of data  between  passenger information systems, including data describing for stops, facilities, timetabling and  fares. Such data can be used by both operational management systems and customer facing systems for journey planning etc.

Scope
NeTEx provides a modular  XML schema for public transport information data including  passenger information systems, with coverage of a number of different subdomains of PT information, including transport network infrastructure and topology, public transport schedules, journey planning, fares, fare validation.  It includes uniform mechanisms for versioning  and identifying entity instances within a global context. It provides protocols for exchanging NeTEx XML documents using either  asynchronous bulk exchange and any file transfer protocol,  or dynamic messaging using http and a set of protocols that make use of the common framework of the Service Interface for Real Time Information. Like Transmodel, on which it is closely based (using model driven design concepts), NeTEx provides reusable abstractions to represent data elements of public transport.

 Part 1 - Network Topology  (CEN/TS 16614-1:2014) describes the Public Transport Network topology and timing concepts; and includes common framework concepts used by all parts.
 Part 2 - Timing Information (CEN/TS 16614-2:2014) describes Scheduled Timetables, including complex rail and non-rail modes;
 Part 3 - Public Transport Fares (CEN/TS 16614-3:2015) covers Fare information, including complex fare models

History
NeTEx is an evolution and offspring of the Transmodel project, which developed a conceptual model to harmonise and systemise the data formats of a number of European countries. It represents a harmonisation of a number of different European standards such as Bison (Netherlands), Trident (France)   TransXChange (UK), VDV 452 (Germany), TAP TSI, for all of which a mapping to NeTEx exists.  There is also a mapping to GTFS.

V1.0 of NeTEx was published by CEN in 2014. V1.1 is under development for completion in 2018/2019.  

In 2017, under the Intelligent Transport Systems Priority Action A Directive (2010/40/E), the European Commission recognized NeTEx as a strategic standard for the cross-border exchange of data to  enable the provision of EU-wide multi-modal travel information services, with the aim of making public transport data available in NeTEx format at National Access Points in all European countries by 2019.

See also
 TransXChange
 Transmodel
 Transport standards organisations
 Identification of Fixed Objects In Public Transport (IFOPT)
 Service Interface for Real Time Information (SIRI)

References
 Comité Européen de Normalisation (CEN), Reference Data Model For Public Transport, EN12896

External links
 NeTEx  
 Transmodel 
 Uk Transmodel  
 OpRa

Public transport information systems
Travel technology
Transport in Europe